Sankt Johann im Walde is a municipality in the district of Lienz in the Austrian state of Tyrol.

Population

References

External links 
 www.st-johann-im-walde.at - city website

Cities and towns in Lienz District